In a Dark, Dark Room and Other Scary Stories is a collection of horror stories, poems and urban legends retold for children by Alvin Schwartz and illustrator Dirk Zimmer. It was published as part of the I Can Read! series in 1984. In 2017 the book was re-released with illustrations by Spanish freelance illustrator Victor Rivas. The book contains seven works: "The Teeth", "In the Graveyard", "The Green Ribbon", "In a Dark, Dark Room", "The Night It Rained", "The Pirate", and "The Ghost of John".

Contents

"The Green Ribbon"
The third story in the book, "The Green Ribbon", follows a girl named Jenny. She always wears a green ribbon around her neck and meets a boy named Alfred. She refuses to reveal to Alfred why she wears the ribbon, despite his pleading, and even when the two are wed, she wears the ribbon every day. Jenny always says she's just waiting for the right time. After reaching old age, Jenny gets terribly sick, she tells Alfred that the time is right, and slowly unties the ribbon while she is on her deathbed, causing her head to fall off. "The Green Ribbon" is derived from a French story of unknown origin, which was popularized by Washington Irving's 1824 short story "The Adventure of the German Student".

"The Teeth"
A kid is hurrying home and comes upon a man. The kid asks the man for the time, and when he replies, the kid sees he has long teeth, scaring him away. He runs and comes upon another man, who asks him why he is running before revealing that he has even longer teeth. The kid once again runs away, encountering a third man with yet longer teeth and finally running all the way home.

"In a Graveyard"
A "very short and very fat" woman asks three corpses in a graveyard if she will be thin like them when she is dead. She is surprised when the corpses spring to life to respond in the affirmative.

"The Night it Rained"
A man is driving in the rain at night when he sees a small boy alone in the rain and offers the child a ride home. The child, Jim, is visibly shivering in his car, so the man gives him a sweater to put on, dropping him off safely with the sweater. When the driver returns for his sweater the next day and knocks on the door, a woman in the home says that Jim was her son, but that he had died almost a year ago. The man apologizes and goes to visit Jim's grave, where he finds his sweater.

"In a Dark, Dark Room"
This story is presented as a series of "dark, dark" places and objects which narrow in scope from a woods to a house within the woods to a room within the house to a chest in the room to a shelf on the chest to a box on the shelf. The dark dark box contains a ghost.

"The Pirate"
Ruth goes to visit her relatives and is playing with her cousin Susan when Susan tells her a pirate once lived in and currently haunts the room Ruth is staying in. Ruth boldly claims that she does not believe in ghosts and she is not afraid. She goes to bed that night, and checks everywhere and finds nothing. When she gets in bed, she laughs and says "There's no one in this room but me" and a scary voice from nowhere says "AND ME!".

"The Ghost of John"
A short limerick style poem about a skeleton.

References

1984 short story collections
Horror short story collections
American picture books
Children's short story collections
1984 children's books